HMS Druid was a 46-gun  fifth-rate frigate built for the Royal Navy during the 1820s, the name ship of her sub-class.

Description
The Druid sub-class was an enlarged and improved version of the Serinapatam design, modified with a circular stern. The ship's tonnage was 1168  tons burthen. Druid was armed with twenty-eight 18-pounder cannon on her gundeck, fourteen 32-pounder carronades on her quarterdeck and a pair of 9-pounder cannon and two more 32-pounder carronades in the forecastle. The ship had a crew of 315 officers and ratings.

Construction and career
Druid, the fourth ship of her name to serve in the Royal Navy, was ordered on 23 July 1817, laid down in August 1821 at Pembroke Dockyard, Wales, and launched on 1 July 1825. She was commissioned that same month and completed at Plymouth Dockyard on 21 December 1825.

On 6 January 1831 Druid was at Rio de Janeiro. There she took on the mail for England that the Post Office Packet Service packet HMS Zephyr (1823) had brought from Buenos Aires and Montevideo. Zephyr had come with the mails from Buenos Aires and Montevideo and would be delayed at Rio for some days while repairing a broken mast.

Druid saw active service in the 1840–1842 "Opium War" against China. In early June 1840, its commander Lord Henry John Spencer-Churchill, youngest son of the Duke of Marlborough, died on board off the coast of Macao. The cause of death was recorded as "congestion of the brain" complicated by dysentery.

Notes

References

1825 ships
First Opium War ships of the United Kingdom
Ships built in Pembroke Dock
Seringapatam-class frigate